'D' Flute Album is the first solo album released by Kevin Crawford. It was released in 1995 on Green Linnet Records. The tracks on this album are Kevin primarily playing the 'D' flute and accompanied by guitar, piano, keyboard and/or bodhrán.

Musicians
Kevin Crawford   (D concert flute, bamboo flute, whistles and bodhrán)
Dónal Clancy   (guitars)
Carl Hession   (piano and keyboards)

Track listing
 George White's Favourite / The Silgo Maid (reels) 3:27
 Jim Donoghue's, Gorman's / Kiss Me Kate (reels) 3:24
 Christy Barry's Set (jigs) 4:08
 Paddy Fahy's / The Echo (hornpipes) 2:48
 Fisherman's Farewell / Junior Crehan's (reels) 3:50
 The Mill Pond / The Battering Ram (jigs) 3:00
 Dillon's Fancy / Maids In The Meadow / Toss The Feathers (reels) 3:10
 Season Of Mists (slow airs) 2:46
 Maurice Lennon's / Connie O'Connell's (reels 2:56
 Jug Of Brown Ale / Spot The Wollop (jigs) 3:49
 Sporting Paddy / The Abbey Reel (reels) 2:30
 Green Fields Of Rossbeigh / The New Policeman (reels) 3:14
 Blackberry Blossom / Brady's / The Steam Packet (reels) 3:23
 The Flowers Of Brooklyn / The Palm Tree / The Bucks Of Oranmore (reels) 3:23

References

External links
 Lúnasa's website

1995 albums
Kevin Crawford albums